Hendren is a surname. Notable people with the surname include:

Bob Hendren (born 1923), American footballer
Denis Hendren (1882–1962), English cricketer, brother of Patsy
James Hendren (1885–1915), Scottish footballer
Jim Hendren (born 1963), member of the Arkansas State Senate and son of former State Senator Kim Hendren
Kim Hendren (born 1938), current member of the Arkansas House of Representatives and former member of the Arkansas State Senate
Patsy Hendren (1889–1962), English cricketer, brother of Denis